Pubic hair is terminal body hair that is found in the genital area of adolescent and adult humans. The hair is located on and around the sex organs and sometimes at the top of the inside of the thighs. In the pubic region around the pubis bone, it is known as a pubic patch. Pubic hair is also found on the scrotum in the male and on the vulva in the female.

Although fine vellus hair is present in the area in childhood, pubic hair is considered to be the heavier, longer and coarser hair that develops during puberty as an effect of rising levels of androgens in males and estrogens in females. Pubic hair differs from other hair on the body and is a secondary sex characteristic. Many cultures regard pubic hair as erotic, and in most cultures it is associated with the genitals, which both men and women are expected to keep covered at all times. In some cultures, it is the norm for pubic hair to be removed, especially of females; the practice is regarded as part of personal hygiene. In other cultures, the exposure of pubic hair (for example, when wearing a swimsuit) may be regarded as unaesthetic or embarrassing and is therefore trimmed or otherwise styled to avoid it being visible.

Development

Pubic hair forms in response to the increasing levels of testosterone in both girls and boys. Those hair follicles that are located and stimulated in androgen sensitive areas develop pubic hair. The Tanner scale describes and quantifies the development of pubic hair. Before the onset of puberty, the genital area of both boys and girls has very fine vellus hair (stage 1). At the onset of puberty, the body produces rising levels of the sex hormones, and in response, the skin of the genital area begins to produce thicker and rougher, often curlier, hair with a faster growth rate. The onset of pubic hair development is termed pubarche.

In males, the first pubic hair appears as a few sparse hairs that are usually thin on the scrotum or at the upper base of the penis (stage 2). Within a year, hairs around the base of the penis are abundant (stage 3). Within 3 to 4 years, hair fills the pubic area (stage 4) and becomes much thicker and darker, and by 5 years extends to the near thighs and upwards on the abdomen toward the umbilicus (stage 5).

Other areas of the skin are similarly, though slightly less, sensitive to androgens and androgenic hair typically appears somewhat later. In rough sequence of sensitivity to androgens and appearance of androgenic hair are the armpits (axillae), perianal area, upper lip, preauricular areas (sideburns), periareolar areas (nipples), middle of the chest, neck under the chin, remainder of chest and beard area, limbs and shoulders, back, and buttocks. Although generally considered part of the process of puberty, pubarche is distinct and independent of the process of maturation of the gonads that leads to sexual maturation and fertility. Pubic hair can develop from adrenal androgens alone and can develop even when the ovaries or testes are defective and nonfunctional. There is little, if any, difference in the capacity of male and female bodies to grow hair in response to androgens.

Pubic hair and underarm hair can vary in color considerably from the hair of the scalp. In most people, it is darker, although it can also be lighter. In most cases it is most similar in color to a person's eyebrows.

Hair texture varies from tightly curled to entirely straight, not necessarily correlating to the texture of the scalp hair. People of East Asian heritage tend to have straight, wavy pubic hair.

Pubic hair patterns can vary by race and ethnicity. Patterns of pubic hair, known as the escutcheon, vary between sexes. On most females, the pubic patch is triangular and lies over the vulva and mons pubis. On many males, the pubic patch tapers upwards to a line of hair pointing towards the navel (see abdominal hair), roughly a more upward-pointing triangle. As with axillary (armpit) hair, pubic hair is associated with a concentration of sebaceous glands in the area.

Clinical significance

Pubic lice 
Pubic hair can become infested with pubic lice (also known as crab lice). The pubic hair can usually host up to a dozen on average. Pubic lice are usually found attached to hair in the pubic area but sometimes are found on coarse hair elsewhere on the body (for example, eyebrows, eyelashes, beard, mustache, chest, armpits, etc.). Crab lice attach to pubic hair that is thicker than other body hair because their claws are adapted to the specific diameter of pubic hair. Pubic lice infestations (pthiriasis) are usually spread through sexual contact.
The crab louse can travel up to 10 inches on the body. Pubic lice infestation is found worldwide and occurs in all races and ethnic groups and in all economic levels. Pubic lice are usually spread through sexual contact and are most common in adults. Occasionally pubic lice may be spread by close personal contact or contact with articles such as clothing, bed linens, and towels that have been used by an infested person. Pubic lice found on the head or eyelashes of children may be an indication of sexual exposure or abuse. Pubic lice do not transmit disease; however, secondary bacterial infection can occur from scratching of the skin. They are much broader in comparison to head and body lice. Adults are found only on the human host and require human blood to survive. If adults are forced off the host, they will die within 48 hours without a blood feeding.

Symptoms of a crab louse infection in the pubic area is intense itching, redness and inflammation. These symptoms cause increased circulation to the skin of the pubic region creating a blood-rich environment for the crab louse. Pubic lice infestation can also be diagnosed by identifying the presence of nits or eggs on the pubic hair. In December 2016 NPR reported that "Frequent removal of pubic hair is associated with an increased risk for herpes, syphilis and human papillomavirus". However, the medical community has also seen a recent increase in folliculitis, or infection around the hair follicle, in women who wax or shave their bikini areas. Some of these infections can develop into more serious abscesses that require incision with a scalpel, drainage of the abscess, and antibiotics. Staphylococcus aureus is the most common cause of folliculitis. Burns can result when depilatory wax is used, even according to manufacturer instructions.

Grooming 
Pubic hair grooming has been associated with injury and infection. It is estimated that about 1/4 groomers have had at least one lifetime injury due to pubic hair grooming. Grooming has also been associated with cutaneous sexually transmitted diseases, such as genital warts, syphilis, and herpes.

Society and culture

According to John Ruskin's biographer Mary Lutyens, the notable author, artist, and art critic was apparently accustomed only to the hairless nudes portrayed unrealistically in art, never having seen a naked woman before his wedding night. He was allegedly so shocked by his discovery of his wife Effie's pubic hair that he rejected her, and the marriage was later legally annulled. He is supposed to have thought his wife was freakish and deformed. Later writers have often followed Lutyens and repeated this version of events. For example, Gene Weingarten in his book I'm with Stupid (2004) writes that "Ruskin had [the marriage] annulled because he was horrified to behold upon his bride a thatch of hair, rough and wild, similar to a man's. He thought her a monster." However, there is no proof for this, and some disagree. Peter Fuller in his book Theoria: Art and the Absence of Grace writes, "It has been said that he was frightened on the wedding night by the sight of his wife's pubic hair; more probably, he was perturbed by her menstrual blood." Ruskin's biographers Tim Hilton and John Batchelor also believe that menstruation is the more likely explanation.

At puberty, many girls find the sudden sprouting of pubic hair disturbing, and sometimes as unclean, because in many cases young girls have been screened by their family and by society from the sight of pubic hair. Young boys, on the other hand, tend not to be similarly disturbed by the development of their pubic hair, usually having seen body hair on their fathers.

A United States study by Alfred Kinsey found that 75% of the participants stated that there was never nudity in the home when they were growing up, 5% of the participants said that there was "seldom" nudity in the home, 3% said "often", and 17% said that it was "usual". The study found that there was no significant difference between what was reported by men and by women with respect to frequency of nudity in the home.

In a 1995 review of the literature, Paul Okami concluded that there was no reliable evidence linking exposure to parental nudity to any negative effect. Three years later, his team finished an 18-year longitudinal study that showed that, if anything, such exposure was associated with slight beneficial effects, particularly for boys.

With the reintroduction of public beaches and pools bathing in Western Europe and the Mediterranean early in the 20th century, exposure of both sexes' areas near their pubic hair became more common, and after the progressive reduction in the size of female and male swimsuits, especially since the coming into fashion and growth in popularity of the bikini after the 1940s, the practice of shaving or bikini waxing of pubic hair off the hem lines also came into vogue.

Grooming  

In some Middle Eastern societies, removal of male and female body hair has been considered proper hygiene, mandated by local customs, for many centuries. Muslim teaching includes Islamic hygienical jurisprudence in which pubic and armpit hair must be pulled out or shaven to be considered as Sunnah. Trimming is taught to be considered acceptable.

According to feminist writer Caitlin Moran, the reason for the removal of pubic hair from women in pornography was a matter of "technical considerations of cinematography". Hair removal progressed to full removal. Because of the popularity of pornography, pubic hair shaving was mimicked by women.

The presentation is regarded by some as being erotic and aesthetic, while others consider the style as unnatural. Some people remove pubic hairs for erotic and sexual reasons or because they or their sex partner enjoy the feel of a hairless crotch.

Methods 
All hair can be removed with wax formulated for that purpose. Some individuals may remove part or all of their pubic hair, axillary hair and facial hair. Pubic hair removal using wax is bikini waxing. The method of removing hair is called depilation (when removing only the hair above the skin) or epilation (when removing the entire hair). Beauty salons often offer various waxing services. It is sometimes referred to as "pubic topiary".

Some women modify their pubic hair, either to fit in with societal trends or as an expression of their own style or lifestyle. Styles of pubic hair modification include:
 Triangle or American wax (pubic hair is shortened from the sides to form a triangle so that pubic hair is hidden while wearing swimwear. The triangle can range from the very edge of the "bikini line" to up to an inch reduction on either side. Remaining hair length can be from an inch and a half to half an inch);
 Landing strip/French wax (pubic hair removed except for a strip of hair extending from the abdomen to the vulva);
 Partial Brazilian wax (pubic hair fully removed except for a small triangular strip); 
 Full Brazilian wax or "sphinx" (complete removal of pubic hair); and
 Freestyle.

There are variations of the Brazilian wax in which a design is formed out of the pubic hair. Stencils for several shapes are available commercially. A controversial Gucci commercial included female pubic hair shaved into a 'G'.

Sexual attraction 
A woman or man's decision to grow or shave their pubic hair can play a role in attracting a partner. A Cosmopolitan study found that a plurality of respondents, both male and female, preferred partners who shave or at least trim their pubic hair. A smaller percentage of 6% of men and 10% of women preferred their partners to go natural and not shave or trim their pubic hair.

In art 

In ancient Egyptian art, female pubic hair is indicated in the form of painted triangles. In medieval and classical European art, pubic hair was very rarely depicted, and male pubic hair was often, but not always, omitted. Sometimes it was portrayed in stylized form, as was the case with Greek graphic art.

In 16th century southern Europe, Michelangelo showed the male David with stylized pubic hair, but female bodies were depicted hairless below the head. Nevertheless, Michelangelo's male nudes on the Sistine Chapel ceiling display no pubic hair.

In the late 18th century, female pubic hair was openly portrayed in Japanese shunga (erotica), especially in the ukiyo-e tradition. Hokusai's picture The Dream of the Fisherman's Wife (1814), which depicts a woman having an erotic fantasy, is a well-known example. In Japanese drawings, such as hentai, pubic hair is often omitted, since for a long time the display of pubic hair was not legal. The interpretation of the law has since changed.

In history 
Evidence of pubic hair removal in ancient India is thought to date back to 4000 to 3000 BC. According to ethnologist F. Fawcett, writing in 1901, he had observed the removal of body hair, including pubic hair about the vulva, as a custom of women from the Hindu Nair caste.

In Western societies, after the spread of Christianity, public exposure of a woman's bare skin between the ankle and waist started to be disapproved of culturally. Upper body exposure due to the use of the popular vest bodices used in Western Europe from the 15th century to early 20th century, as the widespread dirndls used even in more traditionally conservative mountain areas and the more or less loose shirts under these, enabled a permissive view of the shoulders, décolletage and arms allowing a free exposure of upper body hair in women of all classes with less rejection or discrimination than body hair on the sex organs, obviously to conceal by implication. Many people came to consider public exposure of pubic hair to be embarrassing. It may be regarded as immodest and sometimes as obscene. However, it never came to have a full hold in Western culture in wide tracts of Central Europe, until the encroaching of Protestantism during the 16th century on formerly more tolerant customs.

In the 1450s, British prostitutes shaved their pubic hair for purposes of personal hygiene and the combatting of pubic lice and would don merkins (or pubic wigs) when their line of work required it.

Among the British upper classes during the Georgian era, pubic hair from one's lover was frequently collected as a souvenir. The curls were, for instance, worn like cockades in men's hats as potency talismans or exchanged among lovers as tokens of affection. The museum of St. Andrews University in Scotland has in its collection a snuffbox full of pubic hair of one of King George IV's mistresses (possibly Elizabeth Conyngham), which the notoriously licentious monarch donated to the Fife sex club, The Beggar's Benison.

In literature 

In the erotic novel My Secret Life the narrator "Walter", an evident connoisseur of female pubic hair, talks with clear delight of a fine bush of a Scotswoman's thick red pubic hair:

The bush was long and thick, twisting and curling in masses half-way up to her navel, and it spread about up her buttocks, gradually getting shorter there.

In another part of his autobiography Walter remarks that he has seen those "bare of hair, those with but hairy stubble, those with bushes six inches long, covering them from bum bone to navel." And he adds reflectively – "there is not much that I have not seen, felt or tried, with respect to this supreme female article."

In like vein, in The Memoirs of Dolly Morton, an American erotic classic, the attributes of Miss Dean are noted with some surprise – her spot was covered with a "thick forest of glossy dark brown hair," with locks nearly two inches long. One man remarked:

But Gosh! I've never seen such a fleece between a woman's legs in my life. Darn me if she wouldn't have to be sheared before man could get into her.

See also 
 Hair fetishism
 The Naked Woman
 Pubic Wars

Notes

References

External links

 
Secondary sexual characteristics
Puberty